Mykhaylo Oleksiyovich Ishchenko (born 19 May 1950) is a retired Soviet handball goalkeeper who competed in the 1972, 1976 and 1980 Summer Olympics. He won a gold medal in 1976 and a silver in 1980 and placed fifth in 1972. He won another set of a gold and a silver medal at the world championships.

References

1950 births
Living people
Soviet male handball players
Ukrainian male handball players
Handball players at the 1972 Summer Olympics
Handball players at the 1976 Summer Olympics
Handball players at the 1980 Summer Olympics
Olympic handball players of the Soviet Union
Olympic gold medalists for the Soviet Union
Olympic silver medalists for the Soviet Union
Olympic medalists in handball
Medalists at the 1980 Summer Olympics
Medalists at the 1976 Summer Olympics
ZTR players